Rock Shrimp Productions NY, LLC is an independent television production company, with headquarters in New York City. The company was founded in 2005 by Kim Martin and chef Bobby Flay, who serve as executive producers. Rock Shrimp Productions also operates Bread & Butter Post, an in-house post-production company.

List of programs

References

External links
 
 

2005 establishments in New York City
Entertainment companies based in New York City
Mass media companies established in 2005